Joseph-Gédéon-Horace Bergeron (October 13, 1854 – January 22, 1917) was a Canadian politician.

Born in Rigaud, Canada East, the son of T. R. Bergeron and Leocadie Caroline Delphine Coursol, Bergeron was educated at the Jesuits' College, Montreal and took a commercial course at the Montreal Business College, where he obtained a diploma. In March 1877, he received a B.C.L. from McGill University. He was called to the Quebec Bar in July 1877.

Bergeron was first elected to the House of Commons of Canada for the riding of Beauharnois in January 1879 after the death of the sitting member, Michael Cayley. A Conservative, he was acclaimed at the general elections held in 1882 and re-elected in 1887, 1891, and 1896. He was defeated in 1900 but was re-elected again in 1904 before losing in 1908. From 1891 to 1896, he was the Deputy Speaker and Chairman of Committees of the Whole of the House of Commons.

Electoral record 

|-
  
|Conservative
|Joseph-Gédéon-Horace Bergeron 
|align="right"|776 
 
|Unknown
|L. A. Seers
|align="right"| 763 
 
|Unknown
|J. B. C. St. Amour
|align="right"|28   

|-
  
|Liberal
|George di Madeiros Loy
|align="right"|1,822    
  
|Conservative
|Joseph-Gédéon-Horace Bergeron  
|align="right"|1,663

References

External links
 

1854 births
1917 deaths
Conservative Party of Canada (1867–1942) MPs
Members of the House of Commons of Canada from Quebec
McGill University Faculty of Law alumni